Auchmerus trachys is a species of beetle in the family Carabidae, the only species in the genus Auchmerus.

References

Lebiinae